, by William Morgan, was the first complete translated version of the Bible to appear in Welsh in 1588.

Background 
It took some years for the translation to be completed in printed form between the Act of Parliament of 1563 and its publication in 1588. Morgan was a Cambridge graduate and later became bishop of Llandaff and St Asaph. He based his translation on the Hebrew and Greek original Bibles, consulting also the English Bishops' and Geneva versions.  included original translations as well as adaptations of Salesbury's New Testament. In addition to its historical significance, the translation also allowed a highly monoglot Welsh population to read and hear the Bible in their own language for the first time.

1630 version 
The 1630 version is known as the first family or everyday Bible in the Welsh language. Bishop Richard Parry of St Asaph was initially considered its main contributor, modifying William Morgan's 1588 translation of the Bible; he himself did not recognize any other contributing partners. However, evidence shows that his brother-in-law, scholar Dr John Davies, reformed and standardized most of Morgan's 1588 translation.

See also 
 Bible translations into Welsh

References

External links 
 A digital facsimile of a 1588 copy

Welsh literature